Callipappus is a genus of scale insects in the family Callipappidae in the order Hemiptera. There are five described species in the genus, all from Australia.

Genera
Five species have been described:

 Callipappus australis (Maskell, 1890) 
 Callipappus farinosus Fuller, 1897 
 Callipappus immanis (Maskell, 1892)
 Callipappus rubiginosus (Maskell, 1893) 
 Callipappus westwoodii Guérin-Méneville, 1841

References

Scale insects
Sternorrhyncha genera
Taxa named by Félix Édouard Guérin-Méneville